The 1988 United States Senate election in Connecticut took place on November 8, 1988. Incumbent Republican U.S. Senator Lowell Weicker ran for re-election to a fourth term, but was narrowly defeated by Democrat Joe Lieberman, the Connecticut Attorney General and eventual 2000 nominee for Vice President of the United States, who would remain in office until 2013.

Both Weicker and Lieberman would go on to win state-wide elections as independents, in 1990 for governor and in 2006 for Senate respectively.

General election

Candidates 
 Joe Lieberman (D), Connecticut Attorney General
 Lowell P. Weicker Jr. (R), incumbent U.S. Senator since 1971
 Howard A. Grayson Jr. (L)
 Melissa M. Fisher (NAP)

Results

See also 
  1988 United States Senate elections

References 

Connecticut
1988
United States Senate
Joe Lieberman